Nema Sagara is a colonel-major in the Malian Air Force. She received military education since 1986 in Mali, France and the United States. She is one of Africa's most senior female soldiers and one of the few Malian female commissioned officer to have seen combat.

Service 
From 1997 to 2012, she worked in various services, notably at the Bamako airbase 100, Bamako-Sénou airbase 101 and at the general staff headquarters of the Malian armies. During the Northern Mali conflict in 2013, she was number two of the Malian army in the Gao region, recently taken back from the Islamists coalition. She is the head of "militaro-civilian" action in the area.

In 2015, she was appointed deputy commander of the Bamako airbase 100 and became commander of this base in 2016. Her discharge from this post in November 2016 provoked reactions in the Malian press. Since 2017, she is responsible of the Permanent Secretariat to combat the Proliferation of Small Arms and Light Weapons (in French: Secrétariat Permanent de lutte contre la Prolifération des Armes Légères et de Petit Calibre). In 2010–2011,

References 

Living people
Malian military personnel
Year of birth uncertain
People from Bamako
21st-century Malian people
Year of birth missing (living people)